San Bartolo is the Spanish name for Saint Bartholomew. In Spanish speaking countries it is often used as part of placenames, including:

 San Bartolo Coyotepec, in Oaxaca, Mexico
 San Bartolo Soyaltepec, in Oaxaca, Mexico
 San Bartolo Tutotepec, in Hidalgo, Mexico
 San Bartolo Yautepec, in Oaxaca, Mexico
 San Bartolo, Totonicapán, in Guatemala
 San Bartolo (Maya site) near Tikal in Guatemala
 San Bartolo District, in the Lima Province, Peru
 San Bartolo, Veraguas, Panama
 San Bartolo (Mexico City Metrobús), a BRT station in Mexico City

See also
Bartolo (disambiguation)